Joseph Charles "Scoop" Posewitz (September 12, 1908 – September 25, 1993) was an American professional basketball player. He played for the Sheboygan Red Skins in the National Basketball League between 1938 and 1940 and averaged 1.7 points per game. He was the brother of professional basketball player Johnny Posewitz.

References

1908 births
1993 deaths
American men's basketball players
Basketball players from Wisconsin
Guards (basketball)
Sheboygan Red Skins players
Sportspeople from Sheboygan, Wisconsin